Olympic Hockey '98 is an ice hockey game for the Nintendo 64 that was released in 1998. It is a re-release of Wayne Gretzky's 3D Hockey '98, but this time not endorsed by Wayne Gretzky and featuring the license for the 1998 Winter Olympics that were celebrated in Nagano, Japan. It was the video game developer debut of Treyarch. Besides the box art, in-game titles, and some minor graphic changes (such as team logos and colors), every single aspect of the game is practically identical to Wayne Gretzky's 3D Hockey '98. Due to this fact, it received highly negative reviews, with IGN rating Olympic Hockey Nagano '98 a zero.

Gameplay

Olympic Hockey '98 features 14 national teams from the 1998 Winter Olympics: Austria, Belarus, Canada, Czech Republic, Finland, France, Germany, Italy, Japan, Kazakhstan, Russia, Slovakia, Sweden, and the United States.

While the gameplay is very similar to Wayne Gretzky's 3D Hockey, there are minor differences. The rink is bigger than the rink in the previous game (since it is Olympic sized). The game also lists the names of the players below the players.

Release
In Japan, the game was localized and published by Konami under the name  on July 16, 1998.

Reception

Olympic Hockey '98 was panned by critics for being essentially a rebranding of Wayne Gretzky's 3D Hockey '98, which had itself been widely criticized for offering too little improvement over the original Wayne Gretzky's 3D Hockey. All four members of the Electronic Gaming Monthly review team decried its lack of change from the two Gretzky games, with John Ricciardi being particularly vehement: "This kind of shameless rehashing of the same game over and over makes me sick. Did you buy Wayne Gretzky's 3D Hockey or its incredibly unoriginal sequel with the '98 slapped on the box? If so, stay away from this baby, 'cause it's (once again) the same game." IGN gave it a very rare 0 score, stating in its concise review: "We'll post a new review when Midway releases a new game." Next Generation ran a similarly concise review, remarking, "Imagine Midway took the tired Gretzky engine, added Olympic uniforms, replaced trading with 'defections,' and released it without tweaking anything but the default ring size. Well, you don't have to imagine because Midway did it."

GamePro took a more positive angle on the game. While agreeing that it was virtually identical to Wayne Gretzky's 3D Hockey '98, they argued that it was reasonably distinct from the original Wayne Gretzky's 3D Hockey. Since the '98 game was recent enough that many interested players would not yet have bought it, they reasoned that Olympic Hockey '98 was a worthwhile alternative for those who preferred Olympic hockey to the NHL rosters. Nintendo Power was also relatively positive, praising the simulation feel of the Olympic mode, but also commented that "Olympic Hockey is so similar in most respects to the Gretzky games that Gretzky owners should think twice before making the investment." In his review for GameSpot, Kraig Kujawa acknowledged that if one ignored the two Gretzky games and judged Olympic Hockey '98 on its own terms, it was a decent game, but argued that any rating for the game had to also take into account its lack of change from those games, especially since Midway could easily have put both NHL and Olympic teams into one game, effectively making Wayne Gretzky's 3D Hockey '98 and Olympic Hockey '98 a single release. The game held a 44% on the review aggregation website GameRankings based on six reviews.

References

External links
 

1998 video games
1998 Winter Olympics
GT Interactive games
Ice hockey video games
Konami games
Midway video games
Multiplayer and single-player video games
Nintendo 64 games
Nintendo 64-only games
Sports video games set in Japan
Treyarch games
Video games developed in the United States
Video games set in 1998
Video games set in Nagano (city)
Winter Olympic video games